Orrin N. Hilton (1849-1932) was a Denver judge and attorney who participated for the defense in several famous court cases. Judge Hilton successfully defended George Pettibone of the Western Federation of Miners when Pinkerton detective James McParland accused him of conspiracy to murder former Idaho governor Frank Steunenberg.

Judge Hilton successfully defended Vincent St. John in a murder trial in Telluride, Colorado, arguing that the charges were bogus, outdated, and had been prompted by the Mine Owners' Association and the Citizens' Alliance for purposes of revenge against the union organizer.

He was called upon in a general advisory capacity in the Massachusetts murder trial of Joseph Ettor and Arturo Giovannitti, organizers for the Industrial Workers of the World (IWW), who were charged (and acquitted) in the death of IWW striker Anna LoPizzo during the Lawrence Textile Strike.

Judge Hilton played a role in the trial of miners accused of murder in Minnesota, a case which resulted in organizers Elizabeth Gurley Flynn and Joseph Ettor being expelled from the Industrial Workers of the World for putting the freedom of imprisoned organizers above the rights of the miners they were organizing.

Hilton unsuccessfully defended Joe Hill in the appeal of a murder trial in Utah. He was disbarred by the state of Utah following a speech given at Joe Hill's funeral.

Footnotes

1849 births
1932 deaths
American judges
Colorado lawyers
Industrial Workers of the World people